Norumbega Park was a recreation area and amusement park located in "Auburndale-on-the-Charles" near Boston, Massachusetts. The associated Totem Pole Ballroom became a well-known dancing and entertainment venue for big bands touring during the 1940s.

The park offered canoeing and pedal boating on the Charles River, a theater, gardens, restaurants and food vendors, a penny arcade, picnic areas, a zoo and amusement rides. Norumbega Park closed on Labor Day 1963. The Totem Pole Ballroom closed a few months later, on February 8, 1964.

History

Norumbega Park opened in June 1897 and was built by the directors of the Commonwealth Avenue Street Railway in an attempt to increase patronage and revenues on the trolley line running between Boston and Auburndale. The park's name was taken from the Norumbega Tower, a stone tower that Eben Norton Horsford had built across the river in Weston to mark the supposed Norse settlement of Norumbega.

The park’s "Pavilion Restaurant" was managed by Joseph Lee, a skilled chef and former slave from South Carolina. Lee had owned and operated the exclusive Woodland Park Hotel in Auburndale before taking over the restaurant at Norumbega Park.

Norumbega Park attracted hundreds of thousands of patrons each season. Its location on the Charles River meant that the park was accessible by water as well as via steam train, electric trolley, and (more so as the decades went on) automobile. Like other so-called "trolley parks" of its era, Norumbega Park became popular with the increasingly urbanized, middle class population who sought affordable recreation outside the city environment.

By the 1905 season, the outdoor theater at Norumbega Park was replaced by a luxurious enclosed facility called the Great Steel Theater. The new venue featured vaudeville acts, plays (dramas, comedies, and musicals) as well as moving pictures shown on a novel device called a "Komograph". The Great Steel Theater was the largest theater in New England, and the park’s zoo was the largest in New England.

 
Norumbega Park's success continued through the 1920s and beyond. In addition to the original carousel, new attractions were added including bumper cars, a Caterpillar ride and a huge Ferris wheel.

Riverside Recreation Grounds
In the early 1900s, the "Lakes District" of the Charles was the most heavily canoed stretch of water on earth. More than 5000 canoes were berthed along its  length. Norumbega Park, along with Riverside Recreation Grounds in Weston and more than a dozen other local recreational facilities in Newton and Waltham, made the Lakes District locally famous for recreation, athletic competition and fun.

Totem Pole Ballroom
In 1930, as buses replaced the trolleys that ran along Commonwealth Avenue, the Great Steel Theater was converted into the Totem Pole Ballroom. Although more than a hundred ballrooms were advertising in the Boston newspapers, the Totem Pole was a premier facility. Over the course of three decades, the Totem Pole Ballroom featured the most celebrated entertainers in the United States, particularly during the swing era. Music from the ballroom was nationally broadcast over the ABC, CBS and NBC radio networks. Famous acts that appeared at the Totem Pole Ballroom include:

World War II era
During World War II, a United States Army Ordnance Corps company was stationed at Norumbega Park's restaurant. Then-owner Roy Gill organized war bond promotions, scrap metal drives and charity events. The park’s ballfield became home to a women’s professional softball team, the Totem Pole Belles.

Decline
The popularity of Norumbega Park and the Totem Pole Ballroom declined after the war years. Millions of automobiles, along with new and better roads, signaled the end of many local amusement parks. The Charles River became polluted and ill-suited for swimming or even small-craft boating. Area residents were increasingly attracted to the mountains or the seashore on summer weekends. Nantasket Beach and Paragon Park replaced Norumbega Park as the most popular Boston-area location for swimming and amusement rides.

As mentioned, the park and ballroom closed in 1963 and 1964, respectively.

In 2011 the Wurlitzer band organ from the Norumbega Park carousel was completely restored and is playing again for the enjoyment of the public in a variety of parades and events.

Reuse of site

Today the area is the site of a large Marriott hotel. East of the hotel parking lot is the Norumbega Park Conservation Area. Most of the physical relics of the former Norumbega amusement park have been destroyed; however, a few select bits remain.

References and notes

External links

NorumbegaPark.com
Return To Norumbega DVD

Newton, Massachusetts
Defunct amusement parks in the United States
Charles River
Amusement parks in Massachusetts
1897 establishments in Massachusetts
1963 disestablishments in Massachusetts